"The Reverend Mr. Black" (also, "The Lonesome Valley") is a 1963 song by Billy Edd Wheeler, Mike Stoller, and Jerry Leiber.

Background
The chorus came from the 1931 folk song, "The Lonesome Valley," recorded by The Carter Family.

Kingston Trio recording
"The Reverend Mr. Black" was recorded and released by The Kingston Trio in 1963 for their album The Kingston Trio No. 16 and became a top-ten hit for them on the Billboard Hot 100, peaking at number eight. On the Hot R&B Singles chart, it went to number fifteen.

Cover versions
In 1963, Bill Anderson included it on Still.
Johnny Cash covered the song in 1981 for his album The Baron.

Popular culture
A version of "The Lonesome Valley" appears in the 2000 film, O Brother, Where Art Thou?.

References

1963 singles
The Kingston Trio songs
Songs written by Jerry Leiber and Mike Stoller
Songs written by Billy Edd Wheeler
1963 songs